Bogovići may refer to:

 Bogovići, Bosnia and Herzegovina, a village on the municipality of Pale at Bosnia and Herzegovina
 Bogovići, Croatia, a village on the municipality of Malinska-Dubašnica at Croatia

It may also refer to:
 Donji Bogovići, a village on the municipality of Goražde at Bosnia and Herzegovina
 Gornji Bogovići, a village on the municipality of Goražde at Bosnia and Herzegovina

See also
 Bogavići, a village on the municipality of Foča at Bosnia and Herzegovina
 Bogović, a Serbo-Croatian surname